Kent was launched at Chittagong in 1814. Between 1814 and 1823 Kent sailed between India and Great Britain under a licence from the British East India Company (EIC). In 1823 she was sold in England. From then until she was last listed in 1831 she sailed between Liverpool and Africa.

Career
In 1813 the EIC lost its monopoly on the trade between India and Britain. British ships were then free to sail between India or the Indian Ocean and Britain under a license from the EIC.

On 26 November 1814 Kent, Ambrose, master, arrived at Gravesend, from Bengal.

Kent,  Baynes, sailed from Gravesend on 29 June 1815, bound for Fort William, India. On 7 October she was at the Cape of Good Hope (the Cape). She had been boarded off Cape Verde by an armed vessel, believed to be a Carthaginian privateer. The schooner privateer had a burthen of 150–200 tons, was armed with 18 and 12-pounder guns, and had a crew of 25 men. Kent arrived at Bengal on 15 January 1816.

Kent first appeared in Lloyd's Register (LR) in 1815, and in the Register of Shipping (RS) in 1816.

Kent. Ireland, master, arrived at Gravesend on 23 September 1816 from Batavia. On 15 January 1817 she sailed from Deal for India. On 3 May she was at the Cape; she sailed for Bengal on the 8th.

Kent appeared in the registry of Calcutta in 1819 with Farquharson, master, and Palmer & Co., owners.

Ken was sold in England in 1823.

On 21 August 1825 Kent, Cummins, master, ran aground on the North Bank, in Liverpool Bay and was damaged. She was on a voyage from Liverpool to Africa. Kent was refloated and put back to Liverpool for repairs. She had been towed out by a steam tug in a fog when she ran aground.<ref>"Naval Intelligence". 'Liverpool Mercury (Liverpool, England) 26 August 1825, issue 734.</ref>  

In July 1828 Kent, Cummins, master, returned to Liverpool with 1400 casks of palm oil, 379 elephant teeth (ivory tusks), 700 billets of redwood, and 10 fathoms of dunnage wood.

FateLR last listed Kent'' in 1831.

Citations

References
 
 

1814 ships
British ships built in India
Age of Sail merchant ships of England
Maritime incidents in August 1825